Air Marshal Sir Peter Edward Bairsto,  (3 August 1926 – 24 October 2017) was a Royal Air Force officer who served as Deputy Commander of Strike Command from 1981 until his retirement in 1984.

Early life
Bairsto was born on 3 August 1926. He was educated at Rhyl Grammar School.

Military career
Bairsto joined the Royal Navy in 1944 and transferred to the Royal Air Force in 1946 as an aircraftman. He was commissioned into the RAF Regiment with the rank of pilot officer (on probation) on 10 May 1946. On 10 November 1946, his commission was confirmed and he was promoted to flying officer (war substantive).

On 17 July 1947, with the end of Second World War active service, he reverted to pilot officer with seniority from 10 May 1946. On 1 November 1947, he was promoted to flying officer. He transferred to the General Duties Branch, the branch containing navigators and pilots, on 12 December 1951 as a flying officer with seniority from that date. He was promoted to flight lieutenant on 1 August 1953, was awarded the Queen's Commendation for Valuable Service in the Air in the 1955 New Year Honours and an Air Force Cross in the 1957 New Year Honours. In the half-yearly promotions of 1958, on 1 July, he was promoted to squadron leader. In the 1960 Birthday Honours, Bairsto was awarded a further Queen's Commendation for Valuable Service in the Air.

He was promoted to group captain on 1 January 1969, and to air commodore on 1 July 1973 in the half-yearly promotions. He became Director of Operational Requirements in 1973, Senior Air Staff Officer at Support Command in 1977 (retitled Air Officer, Training Group at RAF Support Command in 1978) and Commander of the Northern Maritime Air Region in 1980. He went on to be Deputy Commander of Strike Command in 1981, and retired in 1984.

Later life
In retirement, Bairsto became an advisor to Ferranti Group. He also served as Deputy Lieutenant of Fife. He died on 24 October 2017.

Personal life
In 1947, he married Kathleen Clarbour; they had two sons and one daughter. Following the death of his first wife in 2008, he married Pamela Braid (née Gibson) on 15 May 2010 at Hope Park Parish Church, St Andrews.

By July 1973, he was a Member of the British Institute of Management (MBIM). He was Honorary Colonel of the 79 Engineer Regiment (Volunteers) until 3 August 1992.

References

1926 births
2017 deaths
Companions of the Order of the Bath
Deputy Lieutenants of Fife
Knights Commander of the Order of the British Empire
Recipients of the Air Force Cross (United Kingdom)
Recipients of the Commendation for Valuable Service in the Air
Royal Air Force air marshals
Royal Air Force Regiment officers
Royal Navy personnel of World War II
Royal Navy sailors